Flight 502 may refer to the following accidents and incidents involving commercial airliners:
Lufthansa Flight 502, which crashed on 11 January 1959 on final approach, near Flecheiras Beach just short of the runway, killing 36 people.
LANSA Flight 502, which crashed on 9 August 1970, killing 101 people.
Jeju Air Flight 502, which skidded off the runway upon landing on 12 August 2007, resulting in six people being injured.
Additionally, there is a US movie from 1975 called Murder on Flight 502.

0502